Alejo Véliz may refer to:
 Alejo Véliz (politician)
 Alejo Véliz (footballer)